Fry is an English and Scottish surname which derived from the Old Norse frjó meaning 'seed'. 
Notable people with that surname include:

Abi Fry (born 1986), Scottish musician
Adam Fry (born 1985), English footballer
Adrian Fry (born 1969), British musician
Alexander Fry (1821–1905), English entomologist
Arthur Fry (born 1931), American inventor and scientist
Barry Fry (born 1945), English football manager
Ben Fry (born 1975), American computer software expert and digital art designer
Bertha Fry (1893–2007), American supercentenarian
Beverly Jane Fry, Australian ballerina
Bob Fry (born 1930), American football player
Birkett D. Fry (1822–1891), Confederate general in the American Civil War
C. B. Fry (1872–1956), British sportsman, politician, writer, editor, and publisher
Caroline Fry (1787–1846), British Christian writer
Cecil Roderick Fry (1870–1952), English confectioner
Chance Fry (born 1964), retired American soccer player
Charles Fry (born 1940), British cricketer and cricket administrator, and grandson of C. B. Fry
Charlotte Fry (born 1996), British equestrian athlete
Chris Fry (footballer) (born 1969), Welsh footballer
Christopher Fry (1907–2005), British playwright
Colin Fry (1962–2015), English television show host
Craig R. Fry (born 1952), American politician from Indiana
Dael Fry (born 1997), English footballer
Daniel Fry (1908–1992), American 'alien contactee'
David Fry (born 1960), English footballer
Don Fry, Australian engineer, entrepreneur and philanthropist
Donald Fry (disambiguation), multiple people
Doug Fry, Australian rugby league player
Douglas Fry (1872–1911), Australian artist
Douglas P. Fry (born 1953), American anthropologist
Dustin Fry (born 1983), American football player
Ed Fry (1879–1968), Australian rugby league and rugby union player
Edmund Fry (1754–1835), English type-founder
Edward Fry (1827–1918), British judge
Elizabeth Fry (1780–1845), British prison reformer, social reformer and philanthropist
Ella Fry (1916–1997), Australian artist and musician
Elliott Fry (born 1994), American football player
Emma Sheridan Fry (1864–1936), American actress, playwright, teacher
Eric Fry (born 1987), American rugby union player 
F. E. J. Fry (Frederick Ernest Joseph Fry; 1908–1989), Canadian ecologist
Franklin Clark Fry (1900–1968), American Lutheran clergyman
Franklin Foster Fry, (1864−1933), American Lutheran minister
Francis Fry (1803–1886), English businessman and bibliographer
Fred Fry, Australian rugby league player
Graham Fry (born 1949), British High Commissioner and politician
Hannah Fry (born 1984), mathematician and broadcaster
Harry Fry (rower) (1905–1985), Canadian rower 
Harry Fry (racehorse trainer) (born 1986), British racehorse trainer
Hayden Fry (1929–2019), American football coach
Hedy Fry (born 1941), Canadian politician and physician
Henry Fry (disambiguation), multiple people
Herbert Fry (1870–1953), Australian cricketer and Australian rules footballer
Isaac N. Fry (1827–1900), American soldier
Jacob Fry Jr. (1802–1866), American politician from Pennsylvania
James Barnet Fry (1827–1894), American soldier and author
Janina Fry (born 1973), Finnish pop singer and model
Jeremy Fry (1924–2005), British inventor and engineer
Jerry Fry (born 1956), American baseball player
Joan Mary Fry (1862–1955), British reformer
John Fry (disambiguation), multiple people
Johnson Fry (1901–1959), American baseball player
Joe Fry (1915–1950), British racing driver
Joseph Fry (disambiguation), multiple people
Joshua Fry (1699–1754), English surveyor and adventurer
Ken Fry (1920–2007), Australian politician
L. Fry (1882–1970), pen name of Paquita de Shishmareff, antisemitic activist
Laura Anne Fry (1857–1943), American artist
Lewis Fry (1832–1921), British Quaker, lawyer, philanthropist and politician
Maia Krall Fry (born 1992), English actress and director
Margery Fry (1874–1958), British prison reformer
Mark Fry (born 1952), English painter and musician
Martin Fry (born 1958), English singer
Matthew Wyatt Joseph Fry (1863–1943), Irish mathematician and academic
Matt Fry (born 1990), English footballer
Maxwell Fry (1899–1987), English architect
Michael Fry, American cartoonist, online media entrepreneur and screenwriter
Mike L. Fry (born 1961), American entrepreneur, entertainer, trainer and marketing expert
Nan Fry, American poet
Nick Fry (born 1956), British motorsport executive
Nina Fry, British actress
Norah Fry (1871–1960), British social activist and politician
Pat Fry (born 1964), English motor racing engineer
Paul Fry (disambiguation), multiple people
Peter Fry (born 1931), British politician
Plantagenet Somerset Fry (1931–1996), British historian and author
Reginald C Fry (1878–1932), English architect
Robert Fry (disambiguation), multiple people
Roger Fry (1866–1934), British artist and arts critic
Roger Fry (educationist), British educationist
Ron Scot Fry, British entertainment and artistic director
Russell Fry (disambiguation), multiple people
Ruth Fry (1878–1962), British Quaker writer, pacifist and peace activist
Ryan Fry (born 1978), Canadian curler
Scott Fry, (born  1950) American military officer
Sherry Edmundson Fry (1879–1966), American sculptor
Shirley Fry (1927–2021), American tennis player
Simon Fry (born 1966), Australian cricket umpire
Speed S. Fry (1817–1892), American lawyer, judge, and soldier
Stephen Fry (disambiguation), multiple people
Susan Fry, American author and editor
Susanna M. D. Fry (1841–1920), American educator, activist
Taylor Fry (born 1981), American actress
Theodore Fry (1836–1912), English businessman and politician
Tony Fry, design theorist and philosopher
Tristan Fry, British drummer and percussionist
Varian Fry (1907–1967), American journalist
Wesley Fry (1902–1970), American football executive
William Fry (disambiguation), multiple people

Fictional characters
 Harold Fry, protagonist of Rachel Joyce's novel The Unlikely Pilgrimage of Harold Fry
Philip J. Fry, fictional protagonist of the animated television series Futurama

See also
 Fry (disambiguation)
 Frey (surname)
 Fried (disambiguation)
 Frye

English-language surnames